Qianjia railway station is a railway station located in East District, Hsinchu City, Taiwan. It is located on the Neiwan line and is operated by the Taiwan Railways Administration.

When the station opened in 2011, it was named Shibo railway station, after the Taiwanese pavilion from the Expo 2010 that was relocated nearby. However, the name was met with controversy from locals, who wanted the station name to reflect local culture. The name was changed to Qianjia in January 2013. The pavilion, which was turned into a shopping mall, closed on June 30, 2016.

References

2011 establishments in Taiwan
Railway stations in Hsinchu
Railway stations opened in 2011
Railway stations served by Taiwan Railways Administration